This is a list of mahoran writers.

 Ambass Ridjali (1973, Tsingoni, Mayotte), romancier jeunesse, dramaturge, Les coulisses d’un mariage incertain (2004), Scandales dans la famille X (2008), À part ça, tout va bien à Mayotte ! (2012)
 Alain-Kamal Martial (1974-, Mayotte), dramaturge, La rupture de chair (2001), Zakia Madi, la chatouilleuse (2002), Liberté (2003), Chronique de l’incroyable mais vraie vie d’Abdallah Ouamba (2003), Sazile(2003)…
 Bacar Achiraf (1972, Mayotte), Les mœurs sexuelles à Mayotte (2005)
 Baco Mambo Abdou (Abdou S. Baco, né vers 1965, Mayotte), romancier, nouvelliste, musicien, Brûlante est ma terre (1991), Dans un cri silencieux (1993), Coupeurs de tête (2007), Si longue que soit la nuit(2012)...
 Manou Mansour (1980, Mayotte)
 Noussoura Soulaimana (1967-, Mayotte)
 Nassuf Djailani (1983 ?, Mayotte)
 Kira Bacar Adacolo (1978, Mayotte), Essai d'évaluation de la départementalisation de Mayotte
 Yazidou Maandhui (vers 1985, Mayotte), poète, dramaturge, Le palimpseste du silence ou le silence des Dieux (2005), Évangile de l’espace et du temps, Épître aux lucioles (2006)

See also 
 Indian Ocean literature

References 

Writers 
Mayotte
Writers